Marko Blažić (born August 11, 1999) is a Croatian professional water polo player. He is currently playing for VK Primorje. He is 6 ft 3 in (1.90 m) tall and weighs 243 lb (110 kg).

References

External links
Marko Blažić on Instagram

1999 births
Living people
Sportspeople from Rijeka
Croatian male water polo players